The Key is a 2007 French thriller film directed by Guillaume Nicloux.

Plot
Eric Vincent is in his thirties and lives an uneventful life with his wife Audrey. They are talking about having a child. Eric is contacted by a friend of his biological father he never knew about the latter's death. Eric can come and collect his father's ashes. He is reluctant but then accepts.

Cast

 Guillaume Canet as Éric Vincent
 Marie Gillain as Audrey
 Vanessa Paradis as Cécile
 Josiane Balasko as Michèle Varin
 Thierry Lhermitte as François Maneri
 Jean Rochefort as Joseph Arp
 Françoise Lebrun as Florence Arp
 Maria Schneider as Solange
 Pascal Bonitzer as Jean
 Marina de Van as Sophie
 Yves Verhoeven as Pujol
 Laure Marsac as Florence
 Michaël Abiteboul as Thierry
 Gilles Cohen as Larue
 Hélène Alexandridis as Muriel
 Jean-Louis Coulloc'h as Worzik
 Nicolas Jouhet as Ariel Bessy
 Sylvain Creuzevault as Greg
 Luc Schwarz as Luc
 Mathieu Nicourt as Christophe
 Martial Bezot as Simon
 Olivier Rabourdin as The tattooist

Production
The Key closes the dark and complex detective trilogy of William Nicloux. We find in this film, in supporting roles populating the parallel plots that Eric Vincent (Guillaume Canet), the characters of François Maneri (Thierry Lhermitte), the investigator of a private matter, Une affaire privée, and Michèle Varin (Josiane Balasko), the police captain in That Woman, the second part.

References

External links

2007 films
2007 thriller films
Films directed by Guillaume Nicloux
French thriller films
2000s French-language films
2000s French films